The General Kyd; ex-Stern Stradivarius is an antique cello crafted in 1684 by Italian luthier Antonio Stradivari of Cremona.

It was used by the English cellist Leo Stern in the premiere of Antonín Dvořák's Cello Concerto in B minor in London in 1896.

Noted owners of the General Kyd-Stern are its namesakes, General Kyd and Leo Stern, as well as Lord Amherst of Hackney, W.E. Hill & Sons and Jean-Baptiste Vuillaume.

At the time of Stern's death in 1904, the General Kyd was valued at US$6,000; its current value is US$9.5 million.

This cello, currently owned by the Los Angeles Philharmonic and played by Robert deMaine, was previously played by Peter Stumpf, and was stolen from Stumpf's porch in 2004. The General Kyd was later recovered after narrowly escaping being turned into a fancy CD rack. The "General Kyd" underwent 18 months of restoration by Rafael Carrabba Violins in Seattle and was returned in fine condition to the Los Angeles Philharmonic in March 2016.

References

1684 works
Stradivari cellos
Stradivari instruments